Finlux is a brand name used by Turkish manufacturer Vestel for a line of consumer electronic related products, including flatscreen LED TVs and home cinema audio products. It was originally a brand name in Finland used by Iskumetalli, and the company was then renamed as Finlux in 1971.

Over the years, the brand has been owned by several international companies, including electronics giant Nokia in the 1990s. As of 2009 Finlux is owned by Europe's largest TV manufacturer, Vestel.

History 
The name Finlux first appeared in 1964, when Iskumetalli began marketing TV sets with that brand name after being acquired by the Finnish Lohja conglomerate. Iskumetalli was founded in 1949 and had been manufacturing TV sets since 1958. In 1971, it was renamed Finlux; this was the first time that Finlux had been used as a company name.

In 1977, Lohja started manufacturing Electroluminescence (EL) displays after purchasing the development project, headed by Dr. Tuomo Suntola. The EL displays were manufactured using the atomic layer deposition (ALD) process developed in the project, and were marketed using Finlux brand.

In 1979, Lohja acquired another Finnish TV manufacturer, Asa Radio, which had been manufacturing radio receivers since 1927.

In 1991, the EL manufacturing was sold to Planar. A new company, Planar International was formed to continue manufacturing EL displays in Espoo, Finland. Planar later consolidated all of its EL manufacturing in Espoo and closed its Oregon EL facility.

In 1992, Finlux TV manufacturing was sold to Nokia, which already was manufacturing TV sets with brands Salora, Schaub-Lorenz and Oceanic.

In 1996, Nokia sold all its TV factories and brand names to Hong Kong company Semi-Tech, which continued manufacturing TV sets in one factory in Finland until the year 2000, when the Finnish subsidiary of Semi-Tech filed for bankruptcy.

A new company under the old Finlux name, owned by Norwegian company Otrum Electronics, was formed to continue TV manufacturing. However, they had serious troubles with their product line, which was based on CRT TVs. The market had swung to flat panel TVs and Finlux failed to switch in time. With 50 million euros in debt, the company filed for bankruptcy in September 2005.

In 2006, the Turkish electronics company Vestel, owned by the Zorlu Holding corporate group, bought the Finlux brand.

Sponsorship 

Finlux was the main shirt sponsor for the Swedish team Hammarby 2008–2009.

Finlux sponsored Sheffield Wednesday Football Club from 1986 to 1989, with the unfortunate consequence that the brand name still appears on footage from the Hillsborough disaster.

References

External links
 

Defunct companies of Finland
Electronics companies of Finland
2006 mergers and acquisitions